Parberry Block East is a site on the National Register of Historic Places located in White Sulphur Springs, Montana.  It was built in 1891.  It was added to the Register on April 22, 2009.

It was deemed significant "for its strong association with the commercial history of White Sulphur Springs during the late nineteenth and early-to-middle twentieth centuries" and also as "a fine example of Western Commercial architecture with Late Victorian Romanesque Revival style details."

References

Commercial buildings on the National Register of Historic Places in Montana
Commercial buildings completed in 1891
National Register of Historic Places in Meagher County, Montana
Romanesque Revival architecture in Montana
1891 establishments in Montana